Prehistoric India may refer to any period in the history of South Asia predating the 3rd century BCE.

By periods 
 South Asian Stone Age
 South Asian Bronze Age
 South Asian Iron Age
 Vedic period
 Mahajanapadas

By regions 
 Prehistoric Sri Lanka

See also
 Ancient India
 History of India#Prehistoric era
 History of Pakistan#Prehistory
 History of South Asia
 Prehistoric Asia

Prehistoric Asia